Yusuf III (1376–1417) was the thirteenth Nasrid ruler of the  Moorish Emirate of Granada in Al-Andalus on the Iberian Peninsula from 1408 to 1417.  He inherited the throne from his brother, Muhammad VII, and was a noted builder and poet.

Life 
Yusuf had constructed the northernmost of the Nasrid dynasty palaces on the hill of the Alhambra.  His palace was allowed to fall into ruin after the Christian takeover, leaving only a lovely arcade and tower.  Terraced gardens were reconstructed in the 20th century.

The following is a section of one of Yusuf's poems from Hispano-Arabic Poetry: A Student Anthology, published by James Monroe.  It is typical of the romantic, yearning poetry of al-Andalus, which inspired the later romantic poetry of European chivalry.  However, later Christian poems were strictly limited to male-female yearning, unlike this example.

References

Sultans of Granada
15th-century monarchs in Europe
Poets from al-Andalus
1376 births
1417 deaths
14th century in Al-Andalus
15th century in Al-Andalus
14th-century Arabs
15th-century Arabs